Isostictidae is a small family of medium-sized to large damselflies restricted to Australia, New Caledonia, and New Guinea. 
It contains 12 genera and more than 40 species. Members of this family resemble species in the threadtail family (Protoneuridae).

Diagnosis
Adult: The adults are small to medium in size with a length of 15–40 mm. They have two antenodal crossveins, most postnodal crossveins aligned with crossveins behind them, quadrilateral cell almost rectangular, no supplementary intercalary longitudinal veins, and an anal vein fused with wing margin. Their antennae are seven-segmented.
Larva: The larva has a labial mask short, flat, palps narrow, palpal setae present, premental setae variable, median lobe shallowly cleft; caudal gills saccular to triquetral, strongly nodate.

Ecology
Adults of Isostictidae have many common names and they are narrow-wings, pinflies, pins, pondsitters, and wiretails.
Instream habitat: Isostictid damselfly nymphs occur in streams, rivers, and riverine pools. The adults occur along these habitats. The nymphs are found on submerged vegetation, willow roots, leaf packs and detritus.
Feeding ecology: Nymphs and adults are predators.
Habits: Nymphs of these damselflies are clingers. Adults like to rest on many different plants.
Life history: Some females of some species lay their eggs in dry twigs over lentic freshwater. Other female species may lay their eggs on the bare rocks of waterfalls.

See also

 List of damselflies of the world (Isostictidae)

References

Identification and Ecology of Australian Freshwater Invertebrates

 
Odonata families
Odonata of Australia
Odonata of Oceania
Taxa named by Frederic Charles Fraser
Insects described in 1955
Damselflies